Nancy is the prefecture of the northeastern French department of Meurthe-et-Moselle. It was the capital of the Duchy of Lorraine, which was annexed by France under King Louis XV in 1766 and replaced by a province, with Nancy maintained as capital. Following its rise to prominence in the Age of Enlightenment, it was nicknamed the "capital of Eastern France" in the late 19th century. The metropolitan area of Nancy had a population of 511,257 inhabitants at the 2018 census, making it the 16th-largest functional urban area in France and Lorraine's largest. The population of the city of Nancy proper is 104,885.

Place Stanislas, a large square built between 1752 and 1756 by architect Emmanuel Héré under the direction of Stanislaus I of Poland to link the medieval old town of Nancy and the new city built under Charles III, Duke of Lorraine in the 17th century, is now a UNESCO World Heritage Site, the first square in France to be given this distinction. The city also has many buildings listed as historical monuments and is one of the European centres of Art Nouveau thanks to the École de Nancy. Nancy is also a large university city; with the Centre Hospitalier Régional Universitaire de Brabois, the conurbation is home to one of the main health centres in Europe, renowned for its innovations in surgical robotics.

History

The earliest signs of human settlement in the area date to 800 BC. Early settlers were likely attracted by easily mined iron ore and a ford in the river Meurthe. Its name is first attested as Nanciaco, possibly from a Gaulish personal name. A small fortified town named Nanciacum (Nancy) was built by Gérard, Duke of Lorraine around 1050.

Nancy was burned in 1218 at the end of the War of Succession of Champagne, and conquered by Emperor Frederick II. It was rebuilt in stone over the next few centuries as it grew in importance as the capital of the Duchy of Lorraine. Duke Charles the Bold of Burgundy, was defeated and killed in the Battle of Nancy in 1477; René II, Duke of Lorraine became the ruler.

Following the failure of both Emperor Joseph I and Emperor Charles VI to produce a son and heir, the Pragmatic Sanction of 1713 left the throne to the latter's next child. This turned out to be a daughter, Maria Theresa of Austria. In 1736, Emperor Charles arranged her marriage to Duke François of Lorraine, who reluctantly agreed to exchange his ancestral lands for the Grand Duchy of Tuscany.

The exiled Polish king Stanislaus I (Stanisław Leszczyński in Polish), father-in-law of the French king Louis XV, was then given the vacant duchy of Lorraine. Under his nominal rule, Nancy experienced growth and a flowering of Baroque culture and architecture. Stanislaus oversaw the construction of Place Stanislaus, a major square and development connecting the old medieval with a newer part of the city. Upon Stanislaus' death in February 1766, Lorraine and Barrois became a regular government of the Kingdom of France. A parlement for Lorraine and Barrois was established in Nancy in 1776.

As unrest surfaced within the French Armed Forces during the French Revolution, a full-scale mutiny, known as the Nancy affair, took place in Nancy in the latter part of summer 1790. A few units loyal to the government laid siege to the town and shot or imprisoned the mutineers.

In 1871, Nancy remained French when Germany annexed Alsace-Lorraine. In 1909 it hosted the Exposition Internationale de l'Est de la France between May and November.

Nancy was occupied by German forces beginning in 1940 and renamed Nanzig. During the Lorraine Campaign of World War II, Nancy was liberated from Nazi Germany by the US Third Army in September 1944, at the Battle of Nancy.

In 1988, Pope John Paul II visited Nancy. In 2005, French President Jacques Chirac, German Chancellor Gerhard Schröder and Polish President Aleksander Kwaśniewski inaugurated the renovated Place Stanislas, which was recognised as a UNESCO World Heritage Site in 1983.

Geography
Nancy is situated on the left bank of the river Meurthe, about 10 km upstream from its confluence with the Moselle. The Marne–Rhine Canal runs through the city, parallel to the Meurthe. Nancy is surrounded by hills that are about 150 m higher than the city center, which is situated at 200 m above mean sea level. The area of Nancy proper is relatively small: 15 km2. Its built-up area is continuous with those of its adjacent suburbs. The neighboring communes of Nancy are: Jarville-la-Malgrange, Laxou, Malzéville, Maxéville, Saint-Max, Tomblaine, Vandœuvre-lès-Nancy and Villers-lès-Nancy.

The oldest part of Nancy is the quarter Vieille Ville – Léopold, which contains the 14th century Porte de la Craffe, the Palace of the Dukes of Lorraine, the Porte Désilles and the 19th century St-Epvre basilica. Adjacent to its south is the quarter Charles III – Centre Ville, which is the 16th–18th century "new town". This quarter contains the famous Place Stanislas, the Nancy Cathedral, the Opéra national de Lorraine and the main railway station.

The population of the city proper experienced a small decrease in population since 2007, placing it behind Metz as the second largest city in the Lorraine. However, the urban area of Metz experienced population decline from 1990 to 2010 while the urban area of Nancy grew over the same period, becoming the largest urban area in Lorraine and second largest in the "Grand Est" region of northeastern France. Within the Nancy metropolitan area in recent years, the city population declined slightly (2009–2014) at the roughly same time as a small increase in the population of its urban area (2006–2012).

Climate
Nancy has an oceanic climate (Köppen: Cfb), although a bit more extreme than most of the larger French cities. By the standards of France it is a "continental" climate with a certain degree of maritime (unrelated to the Köppen classification, since generally the whole country has a predominant mechanism favored by the West winds).

The temperatures have a distinct variation of the temperate zone, both during the day and between seasons but without being very different. Winters are cold and dry in freezing climates. Summers are not always sunny, but warm enough. Mists are frequent in autumn and the winds are light and not too violent. Precipitation tends to be less abundant than in the west of the country. Sunshine hours are almost identical to Paris and the snowy days are the same as Strasbourg (most similar weather conditions). Although the lowest recorded temperature is officially −26.8 °C, some sources consider temperatures from −30 °C on 10 December 1879 before continuous data.

Demographics

Main sights

The old city center's heritage dates from the Middle Ages to the 18th century. The cathedral of Nancy, the Triumphal Arch and the "Place de la Carriere" are a fine examples of 18th-century architecture. The Palace of the Dukes of Lorraine is the former princely residence of the rulers. The palace houses the Musée Lorrain.

A historic church is the Church of Notre-Dame-de-Bonsecours, Nancy, final resting place of the last duke Stanislas. Other notable churches are the Church of Saint-François-des-Cordeliers and the Basilica of Saint-Epvre (:fr:Basilique Saint-Epvre de Nancy), which have historical ties to the ducal House of Lorraine.The Place Stanislas named after king of Poland and duke of Lorraine Stanislaus I, Place de la Carrière, and Place d'Alliance were added on the World Heritage Sites list by the UNESCO in 1983.

The "École de Nancy", a group of artists and architects founded by the glassmaster and furniture maker Émile Gallé, worked in the art nouveau style at the end of the 19th century and the early 20th century. It was principally their work which made Nancy a center of art and architecture that rivaled Paris and helped give the city the nickname "Capitale de l'Est". The city still possesses many Art Nouveau buildings (mostly banks or private homes). Furniture, glassware, and other pieces of the decorative arts are conserved at the Musée de l'École de Nancy, which is housed in the 1909 villa of Eugène Corbin, a Nancy businessman and supporter of the Art Nouveau there. The Musée des Beaux-Arts has further collections of the art nouveau movement.

A major botanical garden, the Jardin botanique du Montet, is located at Villers-lès-Nancy. Other gardens of interest include the city's earliest botanical garden, the Jardin Dominique Alexandre Godron, and various other public gardens and places of interest including the Pépinière and Parc Sainte-Marie (public gardens). The town also has an aquarium. The surroundings of the train station are a busy commercial area.

Culture

The city is known for its World Heritage buildings at the Place Stanislas, which was opened April 2005 by Jacques Chirac after refurbishment.At the turn of the 20th century, Nancy was a major center of the Art Nouveau with the École de Nancy. The city possesses a unique and interesting Musée de l'École de Nancy (School of Nancy Museum) with artworks by Émile Gallé, Louis Majorelle, Daum, Caravaggio, and others.Nancy also has other museums:
 Museum of Fine Arts of Nancy (Musée des Beaux-Arts de Nancy) with painters from the 15th to 20th centuries, and a huge collection of Daum crystal displayed in part of the old fortifications of the city.
  dedicated to the history of the Duchy of Lorraine and arts (Jacques Callot collection, Georges de La Tour).
 .
 Musée de l'École de Nancy offers a testimony of the diversity of creative techniques practiced by the artists of this school, with a fine display of furniture, objets d'art, glassware, stained-glass, leather, ceramics, textiles, etc. from the period.
 The Iron History Museum

The city is also the seat of the Diocese of Nancy and the home of the Opéra national de Lorraine. There is a network of libraries, the central of which is Bibliothèque municipale de Nancy.

Nancy is known for its macarons and bergamotes, candies flavored with bergamot essential oil.

Universities and colleges

Nancy has a large number of institutions of higher learning:
 University of Lorraine which merges:
 Henri Poincaré University (Université Henri Poincaré, UHP, also known as Nancy 1)
 Nancy 2 University (Université Nancy 2)
 European University Centre
 National Polytechnic Institute of Lorraine (Institut National Polytechnique de Lorraine or INPL)
 École nationale supérieure des Mines de Nancy
 École nationale supérieure des industries chimiques (ENSIC)
 École nationale supérieure d'agronomie et des industries alimentaires (ENSAIA)
 École européenne d'ingénieurs en génie des matériaux (EEIGM)
 École nationale supérieure d'électricité et de mécanique (ENSEM)
  (ENSG)
 École nationale supérieure en génie des systèmes et de l'innovation (ENSGSI)
 Telecom Nancy (ex-ESIAL)
 École Polytechnique de l'Université de Lorraine (Polytech Nancy)
 École des Beaux-Arts de Nancy
 École nationale supérieure d'art de Nancy
 School of architecture of Nancy (ENSA)
 École pour l'informatique et les nouvelles technologies (EPITECH)
 ICN Graduate Business School (Institut Commercial de Nancy)
 Sciences Po Paris (French-German Undergraduate Campus)
 Centre de Nancy-AgroParisTech
 École Supérieure Robert de Sorbon
 French National School of Forestry, est. 1824, in Nancy
 Web@cademie

Sports

Nancy is home to two of the three professional sport clubs in Lorraine: AS Nancy-Lorraine in football and SLUC Nancy in basketball. AS Nancy-Lorraine's Hall of Fame includes triple-Ballon d'Or and UEFA President Michel Platini, Arsenal manager Arsène Wenger, 1998 World Champion Aimé Jacquet, 2000 European Champion Roger Lemerre, 1998 African Ballon d'Or Mustapha Hadji, Irish legend Tony Cascarino, 1986 European Cup winner Sacha Zavarov and 1958 World Cup Semi-finalist Roger Piantoni.

AS Nancy-Lorraine won the French cup 1978 with captain Michel Platini who scored the only goal of the final (Nancy 1–0 Nice). More recently AS Nancy-Lorraine won the "Coupe de la Ligue" (French League Cup) in 2006 and reached fourth place in the French football league in 2007/2008.

SLUC Nancy won the last Korac European Cup in 2002, reached the finals of French championship of basketball (Pro A) four consecutive times and finally won his first trophy in 2008. Also winner of "Semaine des As" in 2005 and champion of 2nd league (pro B) in 1994.

Prominent people from Nancy

 Lambert-Sigisbert Adam (1700–1759), a lorrain sculptor.
 François-Émile André (1871–1933), architect
 Marie Henri d'Arbois de Jubainville (1827–1910), historian and philologist.
 Charles Baudiot (1773–1849), cellist and composer
 Najoua Belyzel (born 1981), singer
 André Bernanose (1912–2002), chemist, physicist and pharmacologist
 Louis-Émile Bertin (1840–1924), naval engineer
 Jean Galli de Bibiena (1709–1779), playwright
 René-Prosper Blondlot (1849–1930), physicist, best remembered for his mistaken identification of N rays
 Stanislas de Boufflers (1738–1815), statesman and writer.
 Jacques Callot (ca.1592–1635), baroque graphics artist, draftsman and printmaker.
 Henri Cartan (1904–2008), mathematician
 Charlotte Caubel (born 1972), magistrate, politician and minister
 Maxime Chanot (born 1990), footballer

 Paul Colin (1892–1985), poster artist
 Marion Créhange (1937–2022), computer scientist
 Grand Duchess Christina of Tuscany (1565–1637)
 Gérard Cuny (1925–1996), French gerontologist
 Matthieu Delpierre (born 1981), footballer
 Gérard Paul Deshayes (1795–1875), geologist and conchologist.
 Auguste Digot (1815–1864), historian of Lorraine
 Antoine Drouot (1774–1847), one of Napoleon's generals
 Joseph Ducreux (1735–1802), portrait painter, pastelist, miniaturist, and engraver
 Prosper Guerrier de Dumast (1796–1883), proponent of Lotharingism
 Pascal Dusapin (born 1955), composer
 Gisèle d'Estoc (1845-1894), writer, sculptor, feminist
 Lucien Febvre (1878–1956), historian
 Adèle Ferrand (1817–1848), painter
 Francis I, Holy Roman Emperor (1708–1765), duke of Lorraine and later Holy Roman Emperor
 Émile Gallé (1846–1904), Art Nouveau artist
 Edmond de Goncourt (1822–1896), author, critic, publisher, founder of the Académie Goncourt.
 Jean Ignace Isidore Gérard Grandville (1803-1847), illustrator and caricaturist.
 Gillian Henrion (born 2003), racing driver
 François-Benoît Hoffman (1760–1828), playwright and critic. 
 Jean-Baptiste Isabey (1767–1855), painter.
 François Jacob (1920–2013), biologist Won the 1965 Nobel Prize in Medicine.
 Yves Lambert (born 1936), aerospace engineer
 Nicolas Liebault (1723–1795), collaborator of the Encyclopédie by Diderot and D'Alembert
 Hubert Lyautey (1854–1934), Marshal of France
 Louis Maimbourg (1610–1686), Jesuit and historian.
 François René Mallarmé (1755–1835), statesman of the French Revolution.
 Aimé Morot (1850–1913), painter
 Charles Palissot de Montenoy (1730–1814), playwright
 Michel Picard (born 1931), writer, winner of the 2007 Feuille d'or de la ville de Nancy
 Michel Platini (b. 1955 in Jœuf), footballer
 Henri Poincaré (1854–1912), mathematician, theoretical scientist and philosopher of science
 Mlle Raucourt (1756–1815) a French actress, real name Françoise Marie Antoinette Saucerotte.  
 Éric Rohmer (1920–2010), film director
 Pierre Roussel (epigrapher) (1881–1945), archaeologist and epigrapher
 Henri Royer (1869–1938), painter
 Jean François de Saint-Lambert (1716–1803), poet, philosopher and military officer.
 Pierre Schaeffer (1910–1995), noted as the inventor of musique concrète
 Charles Sellier, (1830–1882) painter
 José Touré (born 1961), footballer
 Arnaud Vincent (born 1974), motorcycle racer
 Élise Voïart (1786–1866), writer and translator
 Lucien Weissenburger (1860–1929), architect

Economy

Business
Bellieni, a nineteenth and twentieth century camera maker

Transport
The main railway station is Gare de Nancy-Ville, with direct connections to Paris (high-speed rail line), Metz, Lyon, Strasbourg and several regional destinations. The motorway A31 connects Nancy with Metz, Luxembourg and Langres.

A nearby regional airport Lorraine Airfield provides scheduled air service to several cities within France. 

Public transport within Nancy is provided by Service de Transport de l'Agglomération Nancéienne (STAN), operated by Veolia Transport, operating the Tram by STAN and around 20 conventional bus routes.

The most heavily used route, the Tram T1, is a so-called 'tramway on tires', which is actually a guided busway based on Bombardier Transportation's Guided Light Transit (GLT) technology and using articulated trolleybuses. In addition to diesel buses, Nancy has been served by trolleybuses since 1982, but in 2000 the three-route trolleybus system was reconfigured into a single, longer route and with a surface guidance system added (GLT, or TVR in French). The guidance systems covers about two-thirds of the approximately 10-km route, and the trolleybuses are separated from other traffic over that portion of the route, speeding travel times. During its first two years, the new system suffered many incidents and malfunctions of the guidance system, but now works without significant problems.

Heraldry

The coat of arms of Nancy displays a thistle, originally considered to be a symbol of Virgin Mary, and adopted as a personal symbol by René of Anjou and later by his descendant René II, Duke of Lorraine. Contrary to the Scottish thistle, the one of Lorraine is always shown with its roots. During the wars against Burgundy, the thistle became an emblem for the people of Lorraine as a whole. It officially became the attribute of the city of Nancy in 1575 when Charles III, Duke of Lorraine granted the city with its own coat of arms.

At first, the coat of arms of Nancy had a chief of Lorraine, which meant that the upper part showed the ducal arms, namely three alerions on a red bend. Later, the chief of Lorraine was replaced by a more complex one which gathers the former possessions of the Dukes of Lorraine. The upper row comprises from left to right the arms of the Kingdom of Hungary, the Kingdom of Naples, the Kingdom of Jerusalem and the Kingdom of Aragon, while the lower row comprises the Duchy of Anjou, the Duchy of Guelders, the Duchy of Jülich and the County of Bar. The inescutcheon is the coat of arms of Lorraine itself.

The coat of arms displays the motto, which appeared in the end of the 16th century. It was initially "Nul ne s'y frotte" ("no one attacks it"), but it was changed to Latin "Non inultus premor" in 1616. The motto has a similar meaning to the Scottish one, "Nemo me impune lacessit", usually translated as "No one attacks me with impunity", which also makes reference to the thistle. The coat of arms further displays the Legion of Honour, awarded to the city after the First World War, and the War Crosses 14–18 and 39–45.

See also
 Bibliography of the history of Nancy
 N ray, a figment of local physicist René-Prosper Blondlot's imagination, named for Nancy.
 Parc naturel régional de Lorraine
 The great organ of Nancy Cathedral
 List of twin towns and sister cities in France

Notes

References

External links

 City council website  
 Tourist office website 
 Nancy Convention bureau  
 Place Stanislas Live Webcam
 Phonebook of Nancy
 
 Jardin botanique du Montet (Botanical Garden)

Art Nouveau-related links
 Official website of le Musée de l'Ecole de Nancy (the museum of the Nancy style of Art Nouveau 
 Nancy tourism office page on the "School of Nancy" Museum
 A walking tour of Nancy's Art Nouveau architecture including photos 

 
Communes of Meurthe-et-Moselle
Prefectures in France
World Heritage Sites in France
Burial sites of the House of Vaudémont
Cities in France
Duchy of Lorraine